Amferny Stward Arias Sinclair (born January 15, 2000) is a Costa Rican professional soccer player. He played college soccer for Syracuse University.

Playing career
Amferney Sinclair was born Ronald Arias Jimenez and Yolony Sinclair Clark in Alajuela, Costa Rica. He attended Escuela Bri-Bri and was a standout at Liga Deportiva Alajuelense for 11 years.

He has appeared for his home country at various youth levels, most notably at the 2017 FIFA U-17 World Cup and the 2018 CONCACAF U-20 Championship.

College
Sinclair chose to pursue college soccer at Syracuse University in 2019. At Syracuse, Sinclair appeared in 64 matches during his four years, starting every match of his senior year. As a senior in 2022, Sinclair was named a team captain. He helped clinch Syracuse's first ever national championship with a successful penalty kick in the 7–6 shootout against Indiana. He started 21 matches and played 1,890 minutes.

Semi-pro clubs
Sinclair played for Reading United AC in 2019 and One Knoxville SC in 2022.

Real Salt Lake 
On December 21, 2022, Sinclair was selected by the Real Salt Lake as the 45th overall pick in the 2023 MLS SuperDraft.

Honors
Syracuse University

 Atlantic Division regular season: 2022
 ACC men's soccer tournament: 2022
 NCAA Division I men's soccer tournament: 2022

References

External links
 Syracuse bio

2000 births
Living people
Costa Rican footballers
Costa Rica under-20 international footballers
Costa Rica youth international footballers
Costa Rican expatriate footballers
Association football midfielders
One Knoxville SC players
Reading United A.C. players
Real Salt Lake draft picks
Syracuse Orange men's soccer players
USL League Two players